Meadows Valley Junior/Senior High School is a high school in New Meadows, Idaho.

References

Public high schools in Idaho
Schools in Adams County, Idaho
Public middle schools in Idaho